Ecbatana  ( Hagmatāna or Haŋmatāna, literally "the place of gathering" according to Darius I's inscription at Bisotun; Persian: هگمتانه; Middle Persian: 𐭠𐭧𐭬𐭲𐭠𐭭; Parthian: 𐭀𐭇𐭌𐭕𐭍 Ahmadān; Akkadian:  kura-gam-ta-nu; Elamite: 𒀝𒈠𒁕𒈾 Ag-ma-da-na;  Aḥmeta;  or ) was an ancient city, which was first the capital of Media in western Iran, and later was an important city in Persian, Seleucid, and Parthian empires. It is believed that Ecbatana is located in the Zagros Mountains, the east of central Mesopotamia, on Hagmatana Hill (Tappe-ye Hagmatāna), an archaeological mound in modern Hamedan in Zagros mountains.

History 
Ecbatana's strategic location and resources probably made it a popular site even before the 1st millennium B.C.E. According to Herodotus, Ecbatana was chosen as the Medes' capital in 678 BC by Deioces, the first ruler of the Medes. His intention was to build a palace worthy of the dignity of a king. The Neo-Assyrians do not seem to mention Ecbatana, and it is likely they never penetrated east of the Alvand despite two centuries of involvement in Median areas of the central Zagros. Ecbatana was captured by Cyrus II in 550 B.C, and under the Achaemenid Persian kings and transferred its treasury to Anshan. Ecbatana, situated at the foot of Mount Alvand, became a summer royal residence and treasury until 330 BC. As mentioned in several sources, the city was used as a royal archive because Cyrus's order for the rebuilding of the Jerusalem temple was found in the city. In ancient times, Ecbatana was renowned for its wealth and splendid architecture.

Later, it became the capital of the Parthian kings and was used as a summer residence (whereas Ctesiphon was used as the winter residence), when it became their main mint, producing drachms, tetradrachms, and assorted bronze denominations. The wealth and importance of the city in the Persian Empire are attributed to its location on a crucial crossroads that made it a staging post on the main east–west highway called High-Road. There was a reputation for horses and wheat in the area (Polybius, 5.44.1). Graphite, gold, platinum, antimony, iron, and various minerals are found there; however, the classics mention oil seeps and flares, and there is no evidence of exploitation of resources.

In 330 BC, Alexander the Great captured the Persian treasury at Ecbatana, and he looted the gold and silver decorations of the palace. The place was the site of the assassination of the Macedonian general Parmenion by his order. 

Later, in 305 BC, the city was ruled by Seleucus I, and Mithridates I in 147 BC. In 226 CE, it fell to Ardashir I, and the Muslims, later in 642 CE. The city was destroyed around 1220 by the Mongols invasion and sacked in 1386 by Timur, and the population was slaughtered as a result.

Historical descriptions

Herodotus of Halicarnassus description 

The Greeks thought Ecbatana to be the capital of the Median empire and credited its foundation to Deioces (the Daiukku of the cuneiform inscriptions). It is alleged that he surrounded his palace in Ecbatana with seven concentric walls of different colors. There are some indications that the walls of this complex might be an ancient ziggurat, which was a type of temple tower with multiple stories that were common in the ancient Near East. In the 5th century BC, Herodotus wrote of Ecbatana:"The Medes built the city now called Ecbatana, the walls of which are of great size and strength, rising in circles one within the other. The plan of the place is, that each of the walls should out-top the one beyond it by the battlements. The nature of the ground, which is a gentle hill, favors this arrangements in some degree but it is mainly effected by art. The number of the circles is seven, the royal palace and the treasuries standing within the last. The circuit of the outer wall is very nearly the same with that of Athens. On this wall the battlements are white, of the next black, of the third scarlet, of the fourth blue, the fifth orange; all these colors with paint. The last two have their battlements coated respectively with silver and gold. All these fortifications Deioces had caused to be raised for himself and his own palace."Herodotus' description is corroborated in part by stone reliefs from the Neo-Assyrian Empire, depicting Median citadels ringed by concentric walls. Other sources attest to the historical importance of Ecbatana based on the terms used by ancient authors to describe it such as Caput Mediae (capital of Media), the Royal Seat, and the Great City. It is said that Alexander the Great deposited the treasures he took from Persepolis and Pasargadae and that one of the last acts of his life was to visit the city.

The citadel of Ecbatana is also mentioned in the Bible in Ezra 6:2, in the time of Darius I, as part of the national archives.

Chronicle of Nabonidus description 
This ancient Babylonian text from the 5th century BC describes how Astyages, the last Median king, was dethroned and how Cyrus conquered Ecbatana."King Astyages called up his troops and marched against Cyrus, king of Anšan [i.e., Persis], in order to meet him in battle. The army of Astyages revolted against him and delivered him in fetters to Cyrus. Cyrus marched against the country of Ecbatana; the royal residence he seized; silver, gold, other valuables of the country Ecbatana he took as booty and brought to Anšan."

Polybius of Megalopolis description 
In the 2nd Century BC, Polybius mentions writes about Ecbatana. He mentioned that the wealth and magnificence of its buildings make it stand out among all other cities. It has no walls but an artificial citadel with amazing fortifications. Underneath this is the palace which is about seven stories in circumference, and its magnificence shows the wealth of its founders. During his time, no parts of the woodwork were left exposed. There were silver or gold-plated rafters, compartments in the ceiling, and columns in the porticos and colonnades, and silver tiles were used throughout the structure. In the invasion by Alexander, most precious metals were stripped, while the remainder were stripped during Antigonus' and Seleucus' reigns. However, Antiochus found that the columns of the temple of Aene were still gilded and that several silver tiles were piled up around the temple along with some gold bricks (Polybius, 10.27).

Archaeology
Topographically, Hamadan is characterized by three hills, Mosalla (place of prayer), Tell Hagmatana (Tappa-ye Hagmatana), Sang-e Sir, and the Alusjerd river, which flows from north to south, separates the city into two parts.

The summit of the Moṣallā, an 80 meters high rock hill in the southeast sector, contains stone and brick remnants of a rectangular citadel marked by towers, and is believed to be the Median citadel which dates back no earlier than the Parthian era.

The Tell Hagmatana, also called Tepe Hegmataneh (thought to correspond to the ancient citadel of Ecbatana) has a circumference of 1.4 kilometers and an area of about 40 hectares, which corresponds to a report from Polybius, although the ancient Greek and Roman accounts likely exaggerate Ecbatana's wealth, splendor, and extravagance. Relatively few finds thus far can be firmly dated to the Median era. There is a "small, open-sided room with four corner columns supporting a domed ceiling, similar to a Median-era structure from Tepe Nush-i Jan, interpreted as a Zoroastrian fire temple. Excavations have revealed a massive defensive wall made of mud-bricks, and dated to the Median period based on a comparison to Tepe Nush-i Jan and Godin Tepe. There are also two column bases from the Achaemenid period, and some mud-brick structures thought to be from the Median or Achaemenid periods. A badly-damaged stone lion sculpture is of disputed date: it may be Achaemenid or Parthian. Numerous Parthian-era constructions attest to Ecbatana's status as a summer capital for the Parthian rulers. In 2006, excavations in a limited area of Hagmatana hill failed to discover anything older than the Parthian period, but this does not rule out older archaeological layers existing elsewhere within the 35-hectare site.

Ecbatana was first excavated in 1913 by Charles Fossey.  Fossey discovered fragments of column bases adorned with arabesques and inscriptions, glazed bricks, and faience tiles during the course of the six-week excavation of Mosalla. Based on his chance discoveries, it looks like the 30 meters high mound, Tell Hagmatana, is the site of the Median citadel and Achaemenid royal construction. The sculptured head of a prince was found during the three months excavation of eastern section. Excavations have been limited due to the modern town covering most of the ancient site. In 1969, the Ministry of Culture and Art began buying property on the tell in support of archaeology, though excavation did not begin until 1983. By 2007, 12 seasons of excavation had occurred. In 1974, the Iranian Centre for Archeological Research performed some excavation in the Parthian cemetery located at southeast of Hamedan. The work on the tell is ongoing.

Ecbatana/Hagmatana
Historians and archaeologists now believe "the identification of Ecbatana with Hamadān is secure."  Earlier, a lack of significant archaeological remains from the Median and Achaemenid periods had prompted suggestions of other sites for Ecbatana.

Assyrian sources never mention Hagmatana/Ecbatana. Some scholars believed the problem can be resolved by identifying the Ecbatana/Hagmatana mentioned in later Greek and Achaemenid sources with the city Sagbita/Sagbat frequently mentioned in Assyrian texts, since the Indo-Iranian sound /s/ became /h/ in many Iranian languages. The Sagbita mentioned by Assyrian sources was located in the proximity of the cities Kishesim (Kar-Nergal) and Harhar (Kar-Sharrukin).

It is now proposed that the absence of any mention of Ecbatana in Assyrian sources can be explained by the possibility that Assyria never became involved as far east as the Alvand mountains, but only in the western Zagros.

Sir Henry Rawlinson attempted to prove that there was a second and older Ecbatana in Media Atropatene on the site of the modern Takht-i-Suleiman. However, the cuneiform texts imply that there was only one city of the name, and that Takht-i Suleiman is the Gazaca of classical geography. There is also the claim that Ecbatana used to be the city of Tabriz, which is one of the historical capitals of Iran and the present capital of East Azerbaijan province. The city, which was previously called Tauris, was put forward by John-Thomas Minadoi, who cited that his identification of the city was based on data collected from modern and ancient geographers, recent travel accounts, and local informants. This theory was also promoted by other historians, such as Sir William Jones and the chief French orientalists.

Ecbatana is the supposed capital of Astyages (Istuvegü), which was taken by the Persian emperor Cyrus the Great in the sixth year of Nabonidus (550/549 BC).

Gallery

See also

 Cities of the Ancient Near East
 Cartele Abad, village 80 miles to the north
 Kassites

Notes

References

Sources

External links

 Official Ecbatana website
 Archeological explorations in Hegmataneh enter 20th season
:Category:Tells (archaeology) :Category:Medes :Category:Parthian cities :Category:Hebrew Bible cities :Category:Archaeological sites in Iran :Category:Former populated places in Iran :Category:Buildings and structures in Hamadan Province :Category:Geography of Hamadan Province :Category:Babylonian captivity :Category:Hamadan

Tells (archaeology)
Medes
Parthian cities
Hebrew Bible cities
Archaeological sites in Iran
Former populated places in Iran
Buildings and structures in Hamadan Province
Geography of Hamadan Province
Babylonian captivity
Hamadan
Former capitals of Iran